The Arctic Policy of the Kingdom of Denmark  defines the Kingdom's (Denmark together with Greenland and the Faroe Islands) foreign relations and policies with other Arctic countries, and the Kingdom's Strategy for the Arctic on issues occurring within the geographic boundaries of "the Arctic" or related to the Arctic or its peoples. The Kingdom of Denmark is an Arctic nation with the importance of The unity of the Realm with Denmark in Europe and the self-governing autonomous countries - Greenland in the Arctic and the Faroe Islands in the North Atlantic.

Since Denmark proper is a member state of the European Union, (along with Finland and Sweden) the Arctic policy of European Union will play a role in the kingdom's Arctic strategy.

Arctic Policy of the Kingdom of Denmark 

The Arctic Policy of the Kingdom of Denmark pertains to national defense of the realm and the block grants to Greenland and the Faroe Islands, autonomous Danish dependent territories. This means that the national governments of the islands are responsible for a range of state authorities and the government of Denmark is responsible for national defense, among other policy areas.

Denmark is a member of the Arctic Council and took over the chairmanship from Norway in 2009 and passed it on to Sweden in 2011. Then-Minister of Foreign Affairs, Per Stig Møller, exemplified the Danish ambitions to rely on international cooperation as he stated that “the task of carrying the issues forward and developing common solutions lies to a large part with the Arctic Council” – referring to the Ilulissat Declaration.

In addition to the limits of the Danish realm, Denmark has territorial claims in areas beyond its exclusive economic zone in areas around the Faroe Islands and north of Greenland covering parts of the North Pole, which is also claimed by Russia. Despite having among the largest Arctic territories, Denmark has the smallest Arctic population. In 2018, the Danish Arctic population counted approximately 107.000 people.

History 
Greenland and the Faroe Islands have been colonized by several different powers but was under Danish rule by 1814 despite some protest from Norway among others. However, the Faroe Islands were granted home rule by the Danish parliament in 1949 and Greenland in 1979

Geography and demographics

Greenland 
Greenland is the world's largest island bordered by the Arctic Ocean in the north, the Greenland Sea to the east, Baffin Bay to the west and the Atlantic Ocean to the south. Despite the 2,166,086 km2 area, only approximately 56,000 people lived there in 2019, of which about 88% are Greenlandic Inuit, primarily around the southwestern fjords.

The Faroe Islands
The Faroe Islands are located approximately halfway between Norway and Iceland and are approximately 1,399 km2. Its population is about 52,000 people.

The Arctic Strategy of the Kingdom of Denmark 2011-2020
Denmark launched its Arctic strategy on the back of the Ilulissat Declaration of 2008 in 2010, which is due to be updated by the end of 2020. The strategy places importance on 5 pillars: a peaceful and secure Arctic, self-sufficient growth and societal sustainability, development under respect for the vulnerable climate, environment and nature of the Arctic, and closer cooperation between international partners. The strategy outlines the Danish focus on the crucial respect for international law, specifically the UN Convention on the Law of the Sea.

As Arctic shipping, tourism and the active search for raw materials, energy and organic resources becomes more accessible with the melting ice, the respect for UNCLOS becomes increasingly important to Denmark. Due to the external pressure, securing maritime vessels, seafaring workforce and the local population is imperative to the search and rescue-readiness of the Danish Defense.

Sovereignty, military engagement and diplomacy
Denmark ratified United Nations Convention on the Law of the Sea in 2004 and has submitted documentation for territorial claims north of Greenland among other places in the Arctic  This entails significant challenges pertaining to national security as a rather small state must uphold sovereignty of a vast area.

It is the declared intention of Denmark to work for peaceful cooperation among the littoral Arctic states in the Arctic Ocean in accordance with the Illulissat Declaration. As such, upholding sovereignty in the arena is among the top priorities of the Danish Defence. This entails some degree of military presence by the Danish Defence, which includes the Arctic Command in Nuuk, the Thule Base in northwestern Greenland, and Station Nord, the world's most northern military base. The most recent Danish Defence Settlement Agreement 2018-23 has prioritized the following initiatives dedicated to the Arctic: Augmented surveillance, command, control, communication, and operational efforts is continued and increased as 1.5bn DKK is earmarked for strengthening the Danish Defense in the Arctic. Furthermore, a total of 235 million DKK will be allocated through the Defence Agreement to the following additional initiatives.

 Equipment to prevent pollution in the waters around Greenland.
Focus on different education methods. The important issues are now civil preparedness and contingency education, as well as other projects such as the Greenland Guard.
Initial conscription enrolment assessments to be carried out in Greenland for volunteers who want to sign up for national service.
Subsidised travel schemes for Greenlandic conscripts to travel home.
More apprentice positions for secondary school students to be established in connection to Armed Forces units.
A contribution to the mapping of the ice chart north of 62°N and to the new land mapping of Greenland.
The Ministry of Defence will finance the operational costs of the radio room at the maritime emergency radio in Greenland.

As a small state, it is central for Denmark to work together with international partners to actively collaborate in keeping the Arctic peaceful and avoid military tension in the area. A vital element of Danish involvement in the Arctic is thus diplomacy, which necessitates an active approach to the Danish membership of the International Maritime Organization (IMO), of which the Faroe Islands are one of three associated members, and the Arctic Council, among other international organizations. The IMO is of high importance with respect to supporting realm-wide efforts to implement the highest standards for health, security and environment. In recent years, Denmark has specifically worked in the IMO to ensure that the Arctic and Greenlandic affairs have been subject to attention in the work and decisions regarding pertaining to extraction opportunities for maritime businesses, increased security at sea, and protection of the ocean environment and coastal zones.

The Arctic Council remains the primary international organization through which Denmark concretely collaborates with regional partners. This pertains to questions of environment and has extended to sustainable development and the life quality of indigenous peoples. Another central aspect to Danish involvement in the Arctic Council is a binding agreement among the eight member countries about search-and-rescue missions. Although the Arctic Council has been criticized for its inability to deal with questions of military nature, other institutionalized factors are actively decreasing the likelihood of international disagreements.

New opportunities for economic development in Greenland tempts foreign investors as Greenland works to diversify its economy and create a basis for economic independence and prosperity. An opening of the North East Passage will likewise create new opportunities for the Faroe Islands from increased shipping and sailing activities. The national efforts to create the optimal framework for foreign investments are imperative in this regard such that Greenland and the Faroe Islands live up to international trade regulations and commitments as their economies enter new markets. Both countries are members of the World Trade Organization as part of the Danish kingdom and the European Union, which is also a consideration for other matters of foreign policy in the Arctic.

Moreover, Denmark places heavy emphasis on the need for expanded bilateral cooperation and highlights Canada, the United States, Norway and Iceland as central partners on questions of resource extraction, maritime security, climate, environment, indigenous people, research, education, health and defence. Simultaneously, Denmark is in continuous dialogue with Finland and Sweden on Arctic-related topics.

Economic and social development
Raw mineral resources
The opportunities of economic growth through the natural resources of gas, oil and various minerals in the area are among the main objects in the national strategy. These opportunities are meant to be taken advantage of, but the Danish Foreign Ministry emphasizes that this needs to be regulated and that it needs to be both environmentally and socially sustainable. Mineral extraction is centered around gold, zinc, iron, copper, diamonds, rubies and a range of critical metals such as rare earth minerals. This was expected to serve as a strong foundation for the future economic development of the Greenlandic and Faroese societies.

Organic resources
The basis for exploiting organic resources in the Arctic is respect for historic, cultural and supply-related consideration as fish and ocean mammals make up the single most significant economic output for Greenland and the Faroe Islands. The continued sustainable development of Arctic fisheries are crucial as this business in fact covers nearly 85% of the total export of Greenland  and 90% of the Faroese. As such, structure, function, diversity and integrity in the Arctic ecosystems are decisive with respect to productivity why sustainability is key to approaching these systems for economic gain. The most important areas for the management of organic resources are the Northern Atlantic Ocean, the Denmark Strait and the Davis Strait. The management of these areas are based on a quota system that is adjusted on an annual basis in consultation with private businesses and international organs such as the International Council for the Exploration of the Sea (ICES), the North Atlantic Marine Mammal Commission (NAMMCO), the North East Atlantic Fisheries Commission (NEAFC) and the International Whaling Commission (IWC) to ensure the respect of international conventions in Greenland as well as the Faroe Islands.
 
New opportunities for economic development in Greenland can tempt foreign investors as Greenland works to diversify its economy and create a basis for economic independence and prosperity. An opening of the North East Passage will likewise create new opportunities for the Faroe Islands from increased shipping and sailing activities. The national efforts to create the optimal framework for foreign investments are imperative in this regard such that Greenland and the Faroe Islands live up to international trade regulations and commitments as their economies enter new markets. Both countries are members of the World Trade Organization as part of the Danish Kingdom and the European Union, which likewise is considered an integral partner in other Arctic matters.

Healthcare
Greenland suffers from previous disease patterns such as high child mortality rates, acute and chronic infectious diseases such as tuberculosis as well as a new, western disease pattern relating to lifestyle diseases  As such, the realm approaches health and social sustainability from a collaborative perspective to draw on new technological opportunities and knowledge within the Nordic region and new partners in the rest of the Arctic. This is also related to societal issues where Greenland works together with the Canadian Nunavut-region while the Nordic Council of Ministers have a distinct focus on gender issues.

Science and research
Denmark has been heavily engaged in research in the Arctic and the Technical University of Denmark continues to conduct research typically on geology and environment of global importance. The realm has worked to ensure prime conditions for scientists and researchers to monitor and track the effects of climate change in the Arctic. This is an example of a global issue that requires a global solution, why the governments of Greenland, the Faroe Islands and Denmark have been long-time proponents of international collaboration from local levels to the United Nations while respecting the UN Declaration on Indigenous Peoples’ Rights from 2007.

Already exposed due to the consequences of global warming, Denmark deems the protection of biodiversity and environment crucial to uphold as the climate shifts. Likewise, increased shipping can lead to higher risks of invasive species and contamination along with a range of other anthropogenically induced effects on biodiversity. To curb these tendencies, Denmark works with international partners to protect species and habitats based on surveillance, investigational analysis and proportional regulation.

As an area ripe for international cooperation, scientific research has brought Denmark closer to the northeastern states of China, Japan and South Korea as these three countries continuously increase their Arctic research efforts  The Danish government in 2003 formed a continental shelf project delegated to research institutions across the realm to establish further scientific basis for territorial claims.

See also 

International initiatives
Arctic Climate Impact Assessment
Arctic cooperation and politics
Arctic Environmental Protection Strategy
Arctic Ocean Conference
Arctic Search and Rescue Agreement
United Nations Convention on the Law of the Sea
Nordic initiatives
Nordic Council
Nordic Defence Cooperation
Nordic model
Nordic Innovation
Nordic Investment Bank
Nordic Passport Union
Nordic countries
Subdivisions of the Nordic countries
West Nordic Council

Nation states policies
Arctic policy of European Union
Arctic policy of Canada
Arctic policy of China
Arctic policy of Finland
Arctic policy of Norway
Arctic policy of Russia
Arctic policy of South Korea
Arctic policy of Sweden
Arctic policy of the United States
Foreign relations of the Kingdom of Denmark
Foreign relations of Denmark (section Arctic disputes)
Arctic (section International cooperation and politics)
Individuals of influence
List of people from Greenland
List of people from the Faroe Islands
List of people from Denmark
Knud Rasmussen, 1879–1933, explorer

References

External links
 The Arctic Ministry of Foreign Affairs of Denmark
 Kingdom of Denmark Strategy for the Arctic 2011– 2020
 Official page Department of Foreign Affairs of Greenland
 Denmark / Greenland / Faroe Island at Arctic Council

Denmark
Foreign relations of Denmark
Foreign relations of Greenland
Foreign relations of the Faroe Islands